Arquivos de Neuro-Psiquiatria (English: Archives of Neuropsychiatry) is a monthly peer-reviewed medical journal covering neurology and psychiatry. It is published by the Academia Brasileira de Neurologia. Articles are published in English, with abstracts in English and Portuguese. The editors-in-chief are José Antonio Livramento and Luís dos Ramos Machado (University of São Paulo).

Abstracting and indexing 
The journal is abstracted and indexed in:

According to the Journal Citation Reports, the journal has a 2014 impact factor of 0.843.

References

External links 
 

Psychiatry journals
English-language journals
Academic journals published by learned and professional societies of Brazil
Monthly journals
Publications established in 1943
Neurology journals
Creative Commons Attribution-licensed journals